Pacific/Randolph is a planned light rail station in Huntington Park, California. It will operate as part of the Los Angeles County Metro Rail system. It is part of the West Santa Ana Branch Transit Corridor project. Measure M funds are programmed for a scheduled completion in 2041, though the station may be constructed for an opening between 2033 and 2035.

The station site formerly served as a Pacific Electric interurban stop on the Yorba Linda Line. Los Angeles Railway J streetcars operated on Pacific Boulevard and also stopped here. Pacific Electric Red Car service ended in 1938, while Los Angeles Railway Yellow Cars ran until 1963.

References

Pacific Electric stations
Railway stations in Los Angeles County, California
History of Los Angeles County, California
Railway stations in the United States opened in 1905
Railway stations closed in 1938
Bellflower, California
Future Los Angeles Metro Rail stations
1905 establishments in California
Railway stations scheduled to open in 2033